The Forest of Bere is a mixed-use partially forested area in Hampshire immediately north of Fareham, Portsmouth and Roman Road, Havant and including a small part of the South Downs National Park.

The former uninterrupted forest is now a mix of woodland, open space, ponds, streams, heathland, farmland and downland interspersed by minor villages and the major settlements of Waterlooville (with Cowplain) and Eastleigh (with Chandlers Ford). There are a number of paths and bridleways for walking and cycling. In the southern portion, towards the area south of the Queen Elizabeth Country Park,  conifer plantations were created in the twentieth century.

History
In the 13th and 14th centuries, two royal forests formed a greater forerunner of the later vestigial forest between the New Forest and the Sussex border. North of Southampton between the rivers Test and Itchen was the Royal Forest of Bere Ashley. North of Portsmouth between the River Meon and the suburb of Bedhampton was the Royal Forest of Bere Portchester.

Woodland habitats and contiguous country parks
Listed from east to west, excluding small copses and coppices
Southleigh Forest
Staunton Country Park
The Holt with Stein Wood and Havant Thicket
Bells Copse
Outhills Copse with Stakehills Coppice and Beech Wood
Bushy Lease with Neville's Park and Littlepark Wood
The Queen's Inclosure in Waterlooville
Newlandsmoor Coppice with Malin's Coppice, Drivett's Coppice, Portland Coppice, Potwall Coppice, Broomground Coppice and Greathunt Coppice
Dunsland Coppice with Wards Coppice and Fareham Garden (wood adjoining above group)
Sawyer's Wood
Creech Woods
Place Wood
Mitchelland Copse
Stroud Coppice
Hipley Copse
Waltonheath Plantation with Ashlands Plantation and Staplecross Copse
Goathouse Copse with Russell Copse and Kiln Wood
Grub Coppice with Mill Coppice
West Walk (one of the largest woods) (with Lowerfield Copse and Upperfield Copse)
Dirty Copse with Great Holywell Copse
Mill Copse with Hoegate Commons, The Purlieu and Huntbourn Wood
Orchard Copse with Birching Copse
Close Wood and Bishop's Wood
Shaftesbury Copse, Aylesbury Copse with Ravens Wood, Birchfield Copse, Dash Wood, Dandy Copse and Fiddlers Green
Mushes Coppice with Everitts Coppice, Stonyfield Copse, Flagpond Copse, Sager's Moor, Dimmock's Moor, Ridge Copse, Blackmoor Copse, Waterclose Copse and Sawpit Copse
Brook Wood with Horse Wood, Hallwood Copse, Mansfield High Wood, Hole Copse and Silford Copse
Jacob's Croft, Hangman's Copse, Blacklands Copse, Birch Row, Alder Moor, Maids' Garden Copse and Botley Row (wood that adjoins above group)
Gull Coppice and Bushy Land, in Swanwick
Wellspring Copse with Swanwick Wood
Manor Farm Country Park with Dock Copse, Catiland Copse, Vantage Copse and Durncombe's Copse
Netley Common with Dumbleton's Copse
Telegraph Woods with Beacon Hill Woodland Park
Hog Wood with Milkmeads Copse, Vocus Copse, High Wood and/in Itchen Valley Country Park
Home Wood with Smithys Wood, Cox's Rough, Hut Wood, Marshall's Rows, Spring Copse and Chilworth Common
Otterbourne Park Wood and Pitmore Copse
Home Copse, Long Copse and Rownhams Plantation
The woods that cover most of Cranbury Park
Windmill Copse
Hocombe Plantation with Trodds Copse
Broadgate Plantation
Ampfield Wood with Neville's Copse, Amprield Plantation and Hursley Forest

References

External links
 
 Upperford Copse
 HollyBank Wood
 Fareham Council - Bere

Forests and woodlands of Hampshire
Bere